C12orf54 (chromosome 12 open reading frame 54) is a protein in humans that is encoded by the C12orf54 gene.

Gene 
C12orf54, chromosome 12 open reading frame 54, also known as HSD-29 (hydroxysteroid 29 dehydrogenase) and HSD-30 (hydroxysteroid 30 dehydrogenase) is a protein coding gene. The accession number for this gene is NM_152319.4.

Locus 

Homo sapiens C12orf54 can be found on chromosome 12 (12q13.11) and consists of 15 exons.

Expression 
C12orf54 is expressed in most major tissues. Human C12orf54 is expressed at slightly elevated levels within the testes compared to other tissues although this gene is primarily expressed ubiquitously among various tissues.

Protein 
The C12orf54 protein consists of 127 amino acids. C12orf54 has a predicted molecular weight of 14.5 kdal and a theoretical isoelectric point of 8.66.

Structure 

The predicted tertiary structure of C12orf54, determined that the most highly conserved amino acids are scattered throughout the protein mainly being towards the end.

Localization 
C12orf54 is predicted to be primarily expressed within the nucleus. There is also predicted localization within the cytoplasm which justifies this protein having a nuclear export signal which means that the Human C12orf54 protein goes between both the nucleus and the cytoplasm.

Post-translational modifications 
C12orf54 has several predicted post-translational modifications including phosphorylation and YinOYang sites.

Homologs

Orthologs 
There are known orthologs of C12orf54 found in mammals but not amphibians, reptiles, invertebrates, birds and fish.

Evolution 
C12orf54 is estimated to first have appeared 87 million years ago in rodents. The rate of molecular evolution for C12orf54 was relatively slow since it was slightly lower than Cytochrome C and less rapid than the evolution rate of Fibrinogen Alpha showing that C12orf54 does not evolve rapidly.

References